The 2013 Pro12 Grand Final was the final match of the 2012–13 Pro12 season. The 2012–13 season was the second with RaboDirect as title sponsor and the fourth ever League Grand Final. Leinster won the game 24–18 against Ulster.
	
The win for Leinster ended a run of three successive league final losses.	
A Shane Jennings try in the first half helped Leinster to a 16-6 half-time lead, with Jamie Heaslip getting the second try in the second half.	
	
It was Johnny Sexton's final match for Leinster before joining Racing Métro, and also coach Joe Schmidt's last match before taking over as head coach of the Irish rugby team.

Route to the final

2013 Playoffs
The semi-finals were played on the weekend of 10/11 May 2013; these followed a 1 v 4, 2 v 3 system with the games being played at the home ground of the higher placed teams.

Match

Details

References

External links
Coverage at ESPN

2013
2012–13 Pro12
2012–13 in Irish rugby union
Leinster Rugby matches
Ulster Rugby matches
2013 in Northern Ireland sport